Sphodromantis aurea is a species of praying mantis found in Liberia and Ghana.

See also
African mantis
List of mantis genera and species

References

Aurea
Mantodea of Africa
Insects of West Africa
Insects described in 1917